The 1928–29 Cornell Big Red men's ice hockey season was the 24th season of play for the program. The teams was coached by Nick Bawlf in his 9th season.

Season
The hockey team got some help at the start of the season when Beebe Lake froze in December. The ice was thin but it could be skated on, allowing the team to practice much earlier than they had in recent years. The team was preparing for their first game against Union but the game was scuppered when four members of the opposition came down with Influenza.

Weather became a concern prior to the next match but the Big Red managed to find enough solid ice to play the game. The puddles and cracks ended up hampering the team and led to a fairly slow match. Unfortunately, Cornell wasn't able to score in the game, despite several chances, and lost 0–1. Cornell was able to even their record with a road win against Williams a week later. Llop ended up with the team's first goal of the season but it was the defensive work in the later part of the game that won it for the Big Red.

After the semester break, Cornell would have to content with a change in net as Rhodes replaced Heye, whose heroics had won the Williams match. He ended up turning in a fine performance and the Big Red won their next game 3–1. Their next game looked to be the team's biggest challenge of the season as they took on a very strong Clarkson squad. The team played hard but the Golden Knights were too much for them and overwhelmed the normally stingy Cornell defense with 5 goals. Rhodes performed well despite taking a stick in the eye and remaining in the contest.

Entering the final game of the season, Cornell lost three regular players to academic ineligibility and would have to replace Guthrie, Kingsbury and Llop. Endemann, Redding and Schoales each played their first game of the season, serving as alternates, with normal alternates filling in the starting roles. Captain Clark also switched to wing for the game, allowing Spitzmiller to start at center. All the changes caused a bit of havoc for the team and the Big Red ended up losing the match 1–2.

Roster

Standings

Schedule and results

|-
!colspan=12 style=";" | Regular Season

† Cornell records have the Colgate game being played on February 9 and the score as 3–2 in their favor.

References

Cornell Big Red men's ice hockey seasons
Cornell
Cornell
Cornell
Cornell